Jean-Paul Vonderburg (born 31 July 1964) is a retired Swedish football player.

Career
Vonderburg debuted in 1985 for Hammarby IF in the Allsvenskan. In 1988 when the club was demoted from the first division, he moved to the reigning champions Malmö FF. In 1989, he won his only championship with the club.

In the summer of 1992 Vonderburg left Sweden and moved to the Danish first division side AGF Aarhus. After only one season he moved to Japan and Sanfrecce Hiroshima. He stayed only one season. In 1995, he returned to Hammarby IF. With the club, he rose again from the first division. After a year in the Second Division, he finished his active career in 1996.

National team career
Vonderburg debuted for the national team on 14 February 1990. His debut was a 1–2 defeat against the United Arab Emirates. He remained scoreless, in a 2–2 draw against Greece on 17 April 1991, he scored an own goal.

Club statistics

National team statistics

References

External links

1964 births
Living people
Swedish footballers
Swedish expatriate footballers
Swedish expatriate sportspeople in Japan
Swedish sportspeople of African descent
Sweden international footballers
Aarhus Gymnastikforening players
Hammarby Fotboll players
Malmö FF players
Sanfrecce Hiroshima players
Allsvenskan players
Danish Superliga players
J1 League players
Expatriate footballers in Japan
Expatriate men's footballers in Denmark
Association football defenders
Swedish expatriate sportspeople in Denmark